Orton Rigg is a hamlet in the City of Carlisle district of Cumbria, England.

Location
The hamlet is located south-west of the city of Carlisle and north of the village of Thursby. Other nearby settlements include the village of Great Orton and the hamlets of Little Orton, Cumbria, Baldwinholme, Nealhouse and Cardewless.

Transport 
For transport there is the B5307 road, the A595 road, and the A596 road nearby. There is also the Carlisle railway station, which is on the Settle-Carlisle Line.

References 

 http://www.francisfrith.com/orton-rigg/

Hamlets in Cumbria
City of Carlisle